John Richard Simonett (September 2, 1911 – January 17, 1983) was a politician in Ontario, Canada. He was a Progressive Conservative member of the Legislative Assembly of Ontario from 1959 to 1971 who represented the riding Frontenac—Addington.

Background
Simonett was born in Frontenac County, Ontario to William Harry Simonett and Caroline Barr. He ran an automobile dealership in Sharbot Lake. He died January 17, 1983.

Politics
Simonett served for several years on the council of Oro Township and was reeve for six years.

In the 1959 provincial election, Simonett ran as the PC candidate in the eastern Ontario riding of Frontenac—Addington. He defeated Liberal Armand Quintal by 1,807 votes. He was re-elected in the general elections in 1963 and 1967.

On October 25, 1962, he was appointed as Minister without Portfolio. After the 1963 election, Simonett was appointed as the Minister of Energy Resources. He continued in that position, after the 1967 election, until October 5, 1969, at which time he was appointed as the Minister of Public Works. In 1971, he supported Bill Davis in his bid to become leader of the party. On March 11, 1971, he was appointed to a newly created post of vice chairman of the Ontario Northland Transportation Commission, a move that was criticized as a reward for supporting Davis in the leadership campaign. Simonett announced his retirement from politics in 1971.

Cabinet positions

References

External links 
 

1983 deaths
1911 births
20th-century Canadian politicians
Progressive Conservative Party of Ontario MPPs